TJ Jednota Bánová is a Slovak football team, based in Bánová a quarter of the city of Žilina. The club was founded in 1929.

External links 
https://www.futbalbanova.sk

References

Jednota Banova
Association football clubs established in 1929
1929 establishments in Slovakia